Killing a Traitor is a 2022 Iranian drama film written and directed by Masoud Kimiai. The film screened for the first time at the 40th Fajr Film Festival where it won an award and earned 5 nominations.

Plot 
A group wants to steal from the National Bank of Iran. Mehdi, Shahrokh, Gio, Atlas and others are the apparent thieves of the bank. But they want this money for Dr. Mossadegh's national loan. Dr. Mossadegh insists that Iranian oil must be nationalized. On the other hand, the leader of this group is in love with a woman, but in the clashes that he has with the police in front of the bank, he is shot and the rest of the people run away and…

Cast 
 Amir Aghaei
 Mehran Modiri
 Poulad Kimiayi
 Mani Heidari
 Sam Derakhshani
 Saeid Pirdoost
 Sara Bahrami
 Hamid Reza Azarang
 Farhad Aeesh
 Reza Yazdani
 Pantea Bahram
 Andisheh Fouladvand
 Nader Fallah
 Narges Mohammadi
 Amir Reza Delavari
 Elham Hamidi
 Pardis Pourabedini
 Sepand Amirsoleimani
 Nasim Adabi
 Saman Salur
 Kianoosh Gerami
 Ayoub Aghakhani
 Iliya Keyvan
 Shapoor Kalhor

Production 
The film is a story of camaraderie and democracy. It depicts the life of Mehdi Baligh, an Iranian thief and swindler. Filming took place in February 2021 in Tehran.

Reception

Critical response

Accolades

References

External links

2022 films
Iranian drama films
2020s Persian-language films
Films directed by Masoud Kimiai